Svetlana Nasibulina (born 13 April 1988), known professionally by her ring name Justine Kish, is an American mixed martial artist that competes in the Flyweight division of Bellator MMA. A professional since 2010, she has also competed in the Ultimate Fighting Championship (UFC).

As of February 7, 2023, she is #10 in the Bellator Women's Flyweight Rankings.

Early life
Justine Kish was born in Leningrad, Soviet Union in modern-day Russia and was adopted by an American couple. She discovered Muay Thai as a teenager, while taking up fitness, which eventually led her to competitions.

Muay Thai career
Kish competed in Muay Thai for 10 years, winning 18 matches and a World Muaythai Council championship belt in the process.

Mixed martial arts career

Early career
Kish began her professional MMA career in 2010.  She amassed an undefeated record of five wins and no losses, including a win over future The Ultimate Fighter housemate Randa Markos.

The Ultimate Fighter
In September 2013, it was announced that Kish was one of the fighters selected by the UFC to appear on The Ultimate Fighter: A Champion Will Be Crowned.

Kish was the seventh pick by coach Anthony Pettis.  She was expected to face Bec Rawlings in the preliminary round, but was forced out of the tournament due to a knee injury. This injury also prevented her from appearing on the finale of the show, but Kish made her debut with the promotion in 2015.

Ultimate Fighting Championship

Kish made her official UFC debut against Nina Ansaroff on January 2, 2016, at UFC 195. She won the fight by unanimous decision.

Kish next faced Ashley Yoder on December 9, 2016, at UFC Fight Night: Lewis vs. Abdurakhimov in a catchweight bout as Kish missed weight. She won the fight by unanimous decision.

Kish faced Felice Herrig on June 25, 2017 at UFC Fight Night: Chiesa vs. Lee. She lost the bout via unanimous decision. Kish received media attention after losing control of her bowels during the fight and issuing a humorous response later.

Kish faced Ji Yeon Kim on January 27, 2018, at UFC on Fox: Jacaré vs. Brunson 2. She lost the fight via split decision. 11 out of 14 media scores gave it to Kish.

Kish returned after a two year hiatus and faced Lucie Pudilová on January 25, 2020, at UFC Fight Night 166. She won the fight via unanimous decision.

Kish faced Sabina Mazo on September 12, 2020, at UFC Fight Night 177. She lost the fight via a rear-naked choke submission in round three.

Kish faced  Tracy Cortez on April 17, 2021, at UFC on ESPN 22. At the weigh-ins, Cortez weighed in at 126.5 pounds, a half pound over the flyweight non-title fight limit. Her bout proceeded at a catchweight and she was fined 20% of her individual purse, which went to Kish. Kish lost the close fight via a split decision.

On April 30, it was revealed that Kish was no longer with the UFC.

Bellator MMA 
On January 6, 2022, it was announced that Kish had signed a multi-bout contract with Bellator MMA.

Kish faced DeAnna Bennett on February 19, 2022 at Bellator 274. She lost the bout via unanimous decision.

Kish faced Ilima-Lei Macfarlane on April 23, 2022 at Bellator 279. In an upset, she won the bout via unanimous decision.

Kish rematched DeAnna Bennett on August 12, 2022 at Bellator 284. At weigh ins, Kish came in at 128.4 lbs, 2.4 pounds over the weight limit, for the flyweight bout, resulting in her being a fined a percentage of her purse which went to Bennett and the bout proceeded at catchweight. Kish lost the bout again via unanimous decision.

Championships and accomplishments

Kickboxing

World Muaythai Council
WMC/EMF European Champion (one time)

Kickboxing record

|-
|-  bgcolor="CCFFCC"
| 2012-02-27 || Win ||align=left| Farida Okiko || || Bangla Stadium, Thailand || Unanimous Decision  || 3 || || 
|-
! style=background:white colspan=9 |
|-
|-
| colspan=9 | Legend:

Mixed martial arts record

|-
|Loss
|align=center|8–6
|DeAnna Bennett
|Decision (unanimous)
|Bellator 284
|
|align=center|3
|align=center|5:00
|Sioux Falls, South Dakota, United States
|
|-
|Win
| align=center|8–5 
| Ilima-Lei Macfarlane
|Decision (unanimous)
| Bellator 279
| 
| align=center|3
| align=center|5:00
| Honolulu, Hawaii, United States
|
|-
|Loss
|align=center|7–5
|DeAnna Bennett
|Decision (unanimous)
|Bellator 274
|
|align=center|3
|align=center|5:00
|Uncasville, Connecticut, United States
|
|-
|Loss
|align=center|7–4
|Tracy Cortez
|Decision (split)
|UFC on ESPN: Whittaker vs. Gastelum
|
|align=center|3
|align=center|5:00
|Las Vegas, Nevada, United States
|
|-
|Loss
|align=center|7–3
|Sabina Mazo
|Submission (rear-naked choke)
|UFC Fight Night: Waterson vs. Hill
|
|align=center|3
|align=center|3:57
|Las Vegas, Nevada, United States
|
|-
|Win
|align=center|7–2
|Lucie Pudilová
|Decision (unanimous)
|UFC Fight Night: Blaydes vs. dos Santos 
|
|align=center|3
|align=center|5:00
|Raleigh, North Carolina, United States
|
|-
|Loss
|align=center|6–2
|Ji Yeon Kim
|Decision (split)
|UFC on Fox: Jacaré vs. Brunson 2 
|
|align=center|3
|align=center|5:00
|Charlotte, North Carolina, United States
|
|-
|Loss
|align=center|6–1
|Felice Herrig
|Decision (unanimous)
|UFC Fight Night: Chiesa vs. Lee
|
|align=center|3
|align=center|5:00
|Oklahoma City, Oklahoma, United States
| 
|-
|Win
|align=center|6–0
|Ashley Yoder
|Decision (unanimous)
|UFC Fight Night: Lewis vs. Abdurakhimov
|
|align=center|3
|align=center|5:00
|Albany, New York, United States
|
|-
|Win
|align=center|5–0
|Nina Ansaroff
|Decision (unanimous)
|UFC 195 
|
|align=center|3
|align=center|5:00
|Las Vegas, Nevada, United States
|
|-
|Win
|align=center|4–0
|Randa Markos
|Decision (unanimous)
|RFA 12 
|
|align=center|3
|align=center|5:00
|Los Angeles, California, United States
|
|-
|Win
|align=center|3–0
|Jin Tang
|Decision (unanimous)
|Fusion Fighting Championship 5
|
|align=center|3
|align=center|5:00
|Las Vegas, Nevada, United States
|
|-
|Win
|align=center|2–0
|Christine Stanley
|Submission (armbar)
|RFA 9 
|
|align=center|2
|align=center|3:00
|Los Angeles, California, United States
|
|-
|Win
|align=center|1–0
|Munah Holland
|Submission (triangle choke)
|Ring of Combat 33
|
|align=center|2
|align=center|2:53
|Atlantic City, New Jersey, United States
|

See also 

 List of current Bellator MMA fighters

References

External links
 
 

1988 births
Living people
Sportspeople from Saint Petersburg
Russian adoptees
Russian emigrants to the United States
American female mixed martial artists
Strawweight mixed martial artists
American female kickboxers
American Muay Thai practitioners
Featherweight kickboxers
Female Muay Thai practitioners
American female karateka
Mixed martial artists utilizing American Kenpo
Mixed martial artists utilizing Krav Maga
Mixed martial artists utilizing Muay Thai
Flyweight mixed martial artists
Ultimate Fighting Championship female fighters
21st-century American women